The United Sabah Alliance was a political coalition bringing together Sabah-based parties in Malaysia. It was jointly founded by the Sabah Progressive Party and Homeland Solidarity Party after SAPP left the Barisan Nasional coalition. The Love Sabah Party also joined the coalition but left in 2017 due to disagreements. Later, the Sabah People's Hope Party (PHRS) and Sabah People's Unity Party (PPRS) joined the coalition. However, after the 2018 general election, PHRS left the coalition.

Leadership structure 

 Chairman:
 Mohd Noor Mansoor (IND)
 Deputy Chairmen:
 Yong Teck Lee (SAPP)
 Mohd. Arshad Mualap (PPRS)
 Secretary:
 Edward Dagul (SAPP)
 Treasurer:
 Vacant
 Training Director:
 Vacant
 Youth Chief:
 Jamain Sarudin (SAPP)

 Council Members:
 Amde Sidik (SAPP)
 Melanie Chia Chui Ket (SAPP)
 Richard Yong We Kong (SAPP)
 Japiril Suhaimin (SAPP)
 Mohd. Ashraf Chin Abdullah (PPRS)
 Said Tiblan (PPRS)
 Allaidly Payon (PPRS)
 Anesthicia Bte Usun (PPRS)

Member parties 

As of 2 March 2020, United Alliance member parties include:

Elected representatives

Dewan Rakyat (House of Representatives)

Members of Parliament of the 14th Malaysian Parliament 

United Sabah Alliance MPs in the House of Representatives.

Dewan Undangan Negeri (State Legislative Assembly)

Malaysian State Assembly Representatives 

Sabah State Legislative Assembly

General election results

{| class="wikitable"
|-
! Election
! Total seats won
! Seats contested
! Total votes
! Voting Percentage
! Outcome of election
! Election leader
|-
!2022

See also
 List of political parties in Malaysia
 Politics of Malaysia
 Jeffrey Kitingan
 United Borneo Alliance
 United Alliance (Sabah)

References

External links 
 
 

Defunct political party alliances in Malaysia
2016 establishments in Malaysia
Political parties established in 2016
2018 disestablishments in Malaysia
Political parties disestablished in 2018